The Gargoyle Poets Series were a series of Australian poetry chapbooks published by Makar Press from 1972-1980 and edited by Martin Duwell. Makar magazine produced four issues a year and from 1972 onward one issue was replaced with three small books from the Gargoyle Poets Series. The series consisted of thirty-seven books of poetry between twenty and thirty-six pages in length.

"Makar was established in 1960 as a student run magazine of the English Society of the University of Queensland. Taking its title from the middle-Scots word for maker, it published poetry, fiction, drama and criticism. Graham Rowlands was appointed editor soon after the magazine changed to a smaller format in 1966. Then, in 1968, Martin Duwell was appointed editor, beginning his long association with the magazine. By the early 1970s the poetry published in Makar had evolved, according to Robert Habost in his 1982 assessment for Image, 'from the "gushy", "high flying", imagistic, traditional rhyming verse' of the early 1960s 'to ... stark, concise, condensed verse'.

Makar also conducted a significant series of interviews with contemporary writers, some of which were published in A Possible Contemporary Poetry (1982). In his introduction to this volume, Duwell imagined the Makar audience as 'reasonably intelligent, willing, but puzzled' about the 'profound and acrimonious disagreement about the nature and role of poetry and language'. It was to such debates that Makar addressed itself. The last issue of Makar appeared in September 1980." (AustLit)

Archives for Makar Press, including manuscripts and letters relating to the Gargoyle Poets Series, are available at the Fryer Library, University of Queensland.

Publications and Reviews

Graham Rowlands Stares and Statues 1972 
Alan Wearne Public Relations 1972 
Richard Packer The Powerhouse 1972
Peter Annand The Long-Distance Poet’s Entry into Heaven 1973 
Antigone Kefala The Alien 1973 
Rae Desmond Jones Orpheus with a Tuba 1973 
Kris Hemensley Love’s Voyages 1974 
John Griffin A Waltz on Stones 1974
Stephanie Bennett Madam Blackboots 1974
Eric Beach St Kilda meets Hugo Ball 1974
Carol Novack Living Alone without a Dictionary 1974
John Tranter The Blast Area 1974 
Shelton Lea Chockablock with Dawn 1975
Philip Neilsen Faces of a Sitting Man 1975
Jennifer Maiden The Occupying Forces 1975 
John A. Scott The Barbarous Sideshow 1975
Jennifer Rankin Ritual Shift 1976 
Graham Rowlands Poems Political c.1976
Andrew Taylor Parabolas: Prose Poems 1976
Cornelis Vleeskens Hongkong Suicide : and Other Poems 1976
Lyndon Walker The Green Wheelbarrow 1976
Peter Annand These Ducks: and Other Poems 1977
John Jenkins Blindspot 1977
Rudi Krausmann The Water Lily : and Other Poems 1977
Philip Hammial Hear Me Eating 1977
John Edwards Salt 1977
Graeme Curtis At Last No Reply 1977
Viv Kitson Life Death and some Words About Them 1978
Janice M. Bostok On Sparse Brush 1978
Stephen K. Kelen The Gods Ash their Cigarettes 1978
Billy Jones Cup Full of River 1978
Geoff Page Collecting the Weather 1978
Michael Witts South 1978
Leon Slade Bloodstock Bleeding 1979
Peter Anderson Pretending to be Salvador Dali 1979
Philip Neilson The Art of Lying 1979
Barry O'Donohue From the Edge of the World 1979

References

N.B. AustLit references may require log-in to database.

Australian poetry
English-language poets
University of Queensland